Dacemazine (INN, also known as Ahistan and Histantine) is a phenothiazine derivative which acts as a histamine antagonist at the H1 subtype. First described in 1951, it was never marketed as a drug on its own, although a combination of dacemazine and di-tert-butylnaphthalenesulfonate was sold as an antispasmodic and antitussive under the trade name Codopectyl. It was also assessed as a possible anticancer drug.

Synthesis

Amide formation between phenothiazine (1) and chloroacetyl chloride (2) gives 10-(Chloroacetyl)-phenothiazine [786-50-5] (3). The subsequent displacement of the remaining halogen with dimethylamine (4) completes the synthesis of dacemazine (5).

References 

Phenothiazines
Carboxamides
H1 receptor antagonists